Heath Thorpe (born 3 September 2000) is an Australian artistic gymnast. He was a reserve athlete for the Australian team at the 2018 World Artistic Gymnastics Championships, and represented his country at the 2019 Summer Universiade. He advanced to the vault final at the 2019 Universiade where he finished sixth. Thorpe is a member of Men's Artistic Gymnastics Australian National Squad (2017–Present).

Personal life 
Thorpe studies at the Queensland University of Technology where he is pursuing a degree in communications. He currently resides in Sydney, Australia. He is openly gay.

Gymnastics career 
2018

Thorpe made his international debut as a junior at the 2018 RD761 Junior International Team Cup, where he placed third in the vault final. Thorpe then went on to make his senior international debut at the 2018 Pacific Rim Gymnastics Championships in April and qualified to the vault final, to finish fourth.

Thorpe competed at the 2018 Australian Gymnastics Championships and placed first on floor.

In October, Gymnastics Australia announced Thorpe to the 2018 World Artistic Gymnastics Championships team. Whilst in Doha, Thorpe was announced as the alternate for the team and did not compete in the event.

2019

In February, Thorpe was announced to compete at the Individual Apparatus Artistic Gymnastics World Cup taking place in Melbourne, despite having had surgery to remove screws from his elbow just eight weeks prior to the event.

Thorpe competed at the 2019 Australian Gymnastics Championships, finishing sixth all around, second on floor and third on vault in the senior international competition.

Thorpe was announced to represent his country at the 2019 Summer Universiade in Naples, Italy. Thorpe went on to qualify to the event finals, placing sixth in the vault final.

2021-2022

Thorpe missed out on qualifying for the Oceania quota spot for the Tokyo Olympic Games following a subpar performance at a National Team Camp in April. Despite this, Thorpe competed and finished third all around at the 2021 Australian Gymnastics Championships, hosted on the Gold Coast, in May. His success in the all around was accompanied by a first place in the team event and a second place finish on horizontal bar. Due to a hamstring injury, he could not compete in floor and vault finals, where he finished first place on both apparatus during the all around competition on day 1.

Thorpe competed in Bundesliga for TG Allgäu in Germany throughout September and October of 2021. This was his first professional competitive season. Thorpe also went on to compete in the Wase GymCup in Belgium under the Australian flag where he placed first on floor, horizontal bar and second on vault.

Eponymous skill 
In 2022, Thorpe submitted a request to the International Gymnastics Federation (FIG) to allow leaps to be added to the Code of Points for Men's Artistic Gymnastics. The request was denied by FIG.

Competitive history

References 

2000 births
Living people
Australian male artistic gymnasts
Sportspeople from Brisbane
LGBT gymnasts
Australian LGBT sportspeople
Gay sportsmen
Competitors at the 2019 Summer Universiade